The 2013 Giro d'Italia will be the 96th edition of Giro d'Italia, one of cycling's Grand Tours. The Giro will feature over 200 riders from 23 cycling teams, due to Team Katusha becoming the 19th UCI World Tour team during 2013.

Teams 

Among the 23 teams who will take part in the Giro, 19 will be UCI World Tour teams, and four will be Professional Continental teams. Later the Court of Arbitration for Sport reawarded  a place in the UCI World Tour, making them the 23rd team to take part, taking the total number of riders above 200.



*: Pro Continental teams given wild card entry to this event.

By rider

By nationality

References 

2013 Giro d'Italia
2013